Teecha Baap Tyacha Baap is a Marathi film directed by Atul Kale, and starring Abhishek Sethiya, Mrinmayee Godbole in the lead roles. It also stars Arun Nalawade, Sachin Pilgaonkar supporting roles. The film is produced under Dar Motion Pictures Dar Motion Picture.

Cast
 Sachin Pilgaonkar as Shashi Phaterphekar
 Arun Nalawade as  Vikrant Deshmukh
 Abhishek Sethiya as  Neil Phaterphekar
 Mrinmayee Godbole as Monica Deshmukh
 Makarand Anaspure as Aaburao Tanaji Shringarpure
 Shruti Marathe as Canada Pai
 Kishor Pradhan as Anna
 Anand Ingle and Jayawant Wadkar as Chandru and Indru The Spies

References

External links

2010s Marathi-language films
2011 films
Films directed by Atul Kale